Frédéric Bong (born 27 July 1987) is a Cameroonian professional footballer who plays as a defender for Régional 1 club AS Echiré Saint-Gelais.

Career
Bong was born in Douala, Cameroon. He joined US Créteil-Lusitanos in 2004 after being scouted in Italy playing with a Cameroon national youth team. Bong signed his first professional contract in January 2009. Prior to that, he made his debut for the club in November 2008. He went on to make a total of 80 league appearances in three seasons with Créteil. On 26 May 2011, Bong joined Chamois Niortais as their first signing of the summer.

In his first season with the club, Niort won promotion to Ligue 2. He made his Ligue 2 debut in the first match of the 2012–13 season, a 1–1 draw against Clermont. He remained with Niort for five season, four of which were in Ligue 2.

In June 2016, Bong signed a two-year contract with Paris FC in the Championnat National. For the second time he won promotion to Ligue 2, and in the summer of 2018 he was made captain for the 2018–19 season.

In January 2019, Bong signed a 2.5-year contract with Valenciennes. Short of playing time at the club, he moved on loan to SC Lyon in June 2020 until the end of the 2020–21 season.

Career statistics

References

External links
 Frédéric Bong at FootNational
 
 

1987 births
Living people
Footballers from Douala
Association football defenders
Cameroonian footballers
Cameroonian expatriate footballers
Cameroonian expatriate sportspeople in France
Expatriate footballers in France
US Créteil-Lusitanos players
Chamois Niortais F.C. players
Paris FC players
Valenciennes FC players
Lyon La Duchère players
Ligue 2 players
Championnat National players
Championnat National 3 players
Régional 1 players